City of Angels is an album by the Motown soul group The Miracles, released on Motown Records' Tamla label in September 1975. The group's fourth album recorded after replacing lead singer Smokey Robinson with Billy Griffin in 1972, City of Angels is a concept album, depicting of a man from "Anytown, U.S.A." who follows his estranged girlfriend Charlotte to Los Angeles, where she has gone in hopes of becoming a star. All of the tracks on the album were written by Billy Griffin and Miracles bass singer Pete Moore. Freddie Perren and Moore served as the album's producers.

The album's first single, "Love Machine", peaked at number-one on the Billboard Hot 100 on March 6, 1976, and was a multi-million-selling platinum single, becoming the most successful single of The Miracles' career. Its success coincided with the rise of the disco craze of the late 1970s. Another song on City of Angels, "Ain't Nobody Straight in L.A.", caused controversy due to addressing the subject of homosexuality: "Ain't nobody straight in L.A./It seems that everybody is gay."

Life imitates art
The album's cover depicted The Miracles' "star" on the Hollywood Walk Of Fame, although the group actually did not have such a star back in 1976. However, life eventually did imitate art, as The Miracles were honored with just such a star in Hollywood on March 20, 2009.

City of Angels reached 33 on the Billboard 200 albums chart in the United States, and peaked at number 29 on the Billboard Black Albums chart.  The Miracles' City Of Angels was also a Platinum album with over one million records sold.

The song "Overture" from that album, co-written by Moore and Billy Griffin, was used as the official theme on Radio Monte Carlo in France from 1978 to 1979. While not available on CD in the U.S. until more recently, City of Angels was available in its entirety on the Motown import release, The Miracles – The Essential Collection.

In 2010, Motown released City Of Angels on CD in the U.S. for the first time – on Hip-O Select's "Motown Select" website, with the extended 12" version of "Love Machine" as a bonus track. Along with a never-before released essay by writer David Nathan, it included commentary by Miracles members Pete Moore and Billy Griffin, the album's composers.

Legacy
Rapper/producer Danny! reinterpreted the plot of "Poor Charlotte" for his 2006 album Charm.

Track listing
All songs written by William Griffin and Warren "Pete" Moore.

Side one
 "Overture" – 3:10
 "City of Angels" – 4:50
 "Free Press" – 3:15
 "Ain't Nobody Straight In L.A." – 3:48
 "Night Life" – 4:27

Side two
 "Love Machine" – 6:52
 "My Name is Michael" – 3:00
 "Poor Charlotte" – 6:05
 "Waldo Roderick DeHammersmith" – 3:06
 "Smog" – 5:16

Personnel

The Miracles
Billy Griffin – lead vocals, guitar, co-composer
Bobby Rogers – backing vocals
Pete Moore – backing vocals, producer, co-composer
Ronnie White – backing vocals

Additional
Freddie Perren – producer, synthesizer (ARP & string ensemble), vibraphone
Donald Griffin – guitar
Greg Poree – guitar
Jay Graydon – guitar
John Barnes – keyboards, synthesizer
Ed Greene – drums
James Gadson – drums
Scott Edwards – bass
Eddie "Bongo" Brown – congas, bongos
Paulinho da Costa – percussion
Victor Feldman – vibraphone
Carolyn Willis – vocals
Julia Tillman – vocals

Charts

Weekly charts

References

External links
 The Miracles-City Of Angels at Discogs
 Dusty Groove album review 
 The Miracles-City Of Angels: Original Album cover image

1975 albums
Concept albums
The Miracles albums
Tamla Records albums
Albums produced by Freddie Perren
Albums produced by Pete Moore